Tippu may refer to:
 Tippu Sultan, Indian ruler
 Tippu (singer) (born 1978), South Indian film playback singer

See also 
 Tipu (disambiguation)